The Enfield Haunting is a British drama horror series which was commissioned by Sky Living and first aired on 3 May 2015. Kristoffer Nyholm, who rose to fame after the hugely popular Danish series, The Killing, directed the new three-parter.

The series is based on Guy Lyon Playfair’s book, This House Is Haunted and is about a series of bizarre events around the phenomena collectively known as ‘The Enfield Poltergeist’ that took place at a council house from August 1977 to 1979.

The drama draws upon recordings and witness statements to draw the audience in to the unfolding supernatural events. The series finished on 17 May 2015 after the third and last episode aired.

Characters 
Matthew Macfadyen played Guy Lyon Playfair, an experienced but sceptical investigator, while  Timothy Spall played Maurice Grosse, an amateur paranormal researcher. BAFTA-nominated Juliet Stevenson also joined the cast to play Maurice’s wife Betty Grosse in the series.

Cast and characters 
 Timothy Spall as Maurice Grosse
 Juliet Stevenson as Betty Grosse
 Matthew Macfadyen as Guy Lyon Playfair
 Rosie Cavaliero as Peggy Hodgson
 Eleanor Worthington Cox as Janet Hodgson
Fern Deacon as Margaret Hodgson
 Simon Chandler as John Beloff
Sean Francis as Ray
Charles Furness as Simon
 Martin Hancock as Tony
Amanda Lawrence as Lindy Crane
Neal Barry as John
Sudha Bhuchar as Head of Psychiatry 
Nigel Boyle as Graham Morris
Myah Bristow as Girl Patient
Karen Lewis as Dr. Anita Gregory
Peter McCabe as Alan Crane
Tommy McDonnell as Doug Bence
Steven O'Neill as Psychiatric Doctor
 Susannah Wise as Sylvie
 Ron Hedley as Terry

Ratings 
The three episodes were the highest-rated programmes on Sky Living. Previously, the highest-rated episode of a Sky Living programme was the sixth episode of the first series of The Blacklist called "Gina Zanetakos" which aired on 8 October 2013 and garnered 1,197,000 viewers. But that record was shattered by the first episode of The Enfield Haunting, which aired on 3 May 2015, and garnered 1,871,000 viewers. The second episode, which aired on 10 May 2015, garnered 1,302,000 viewers, and the third and final episode, which aired on 17 May 2015, garnered 1,262,000 viewers.

Reviews
Michael Hogan writing for The Telegraph gave The Enfield Haunting four stars out of five saying "This Seventies-set chiller was scarily compelling". while Ellen E Jones writing for The Independent called it "North London meets The Exorcist in eerie suburban drama" while Grace Dent writing for the same paper wrote, "The Enfield Haunting'''s poltergeist was about as scary as a drunk uncle" while  Julia Raeside writing for The Guardian said, "This supernatural account of the famous 1970s London poltergeist is packed with genuine thrills and superb performances from a young cast."

Broadcast
The show was broadcast in Canada and the United States on A&E. It is also available as a streaming video on Shomi.
The three episodes were also broadcast in France and Germany on the public Franco-German TV network Arte.

See also
 The Conjuring 2'', a 2016 horror film based on the same event, The Enfield Poltergeist
 Ed and Lorraine Warren, the paranormal investigators of The Enfield Poltergeist

References

External links 

Features.sky.com

2010s British drama television series
2010s British horror television series
2015 British television series debuts
2015 British television series endings
British horror fiction television series
2010s British television miniseries
English-language television shows
Horror drama television series
Sky Living original programming
Television series by Sony Pictures Television
Television shows set in London